DÖSİMM, an acronym for Döner Sermaye İşletmesi Merkez Müdürlüğü ("Revolving Funds Management Central Directory") is a sub unit of Ministry of Culture and Tourism of Turkey.

DÖSİMM has a market chain in Turkey which sell traditional crafts and books. It is also responsible in museum revenue and provides resources for protection, maintenance, and development of cultural heritage, and culture and tourism infrastructure investments.

Statistics 
The total number of visitors to DÖSİMM - controlled locations in 2017 was 20 509 000.

The most visited locations are listed below

Notes

References

Tourism in Turkey
Cultural heritage of Turkey
Museums in Turkey
Government agencies of Turkey
Turkish culture
Tourist attractions in Turkey